Desperate Acquaintances is a 1998 Norwegian drama film directed by Svend Wam, starring Anders Dale, Janic Heen and Bjarte Hjelmeland. It is about three men in their mid-twenties – Anders (Dale), Mefistofeles (Heen) and Yngve (Hjelmeland) – who are struggling to fit in.

External links
 
 
 Desperate Acquaintances at the Norwegian Film Institute

1998 films
1998 drama films
Norwegian drama films